Bintulu Airport  is an airport serving Bintulu, a town in the state of Sarawak in Malaysia. In 2008, the airport handled 417,918 passengers and 16,787 aircraft movements.

History

History of Bintulu airport began in early 1937 when the British colony built an airfield situated between a river at one end and the sea coast at the other end.

Bintulu old airport was open for operation on 1 September 1955, with a grass-surface runway catering for de Havilland DH.89 Dragon Rapide and Scottish Aviation Twin Pioneer aircraft operated by Borneo Airways.

In 1963, bigger types of aircraft such as DC-3 services were introduced. In 1966, the runway was resurfaced with bitumen and the terminal building was also extended to cater for increasing number of passenger.

On 1 July 1968, Malaysia-Singapore Airlines introduced scheduled Fokker 27 services into Bintulu. The terminal building and the parking apron was extended in 1981 to accommodate Fokker 50 aircraft. The old airport served the town until 30th March 2003 when it closed and moved to a location outside of town.

In September 2005, first low-cost airline in Malaysia, AirAsia started operating in Bintulu airport. FlyAsianXpress (FAX), subsidiary company for AirAsia has taken over major domestic routes linking Bintulu, started its operation on 1 August 2006, until 30 September 2007. On 1 October 2007, Malaysia Airlines subsidiary, MASwings took over the link connecting Bintulu.

Airlines and destinations

Traffic and Statistics

Traffic

Statistics

Pan Borneo Highway project
Bintulu Airport is one of 11 work package contract (WPCs) as its junction will be part of it. It was conducted by Lebuhraya Borneo Utara Sdn Bhd (LBU) as turnkey contractor and was taken by KKBWCT Joint Venture Sdn Bhd to Sungai Arip in Sibu and Pekerjaan Piasau Konkerit Sdn Bhd (PPK) to Sungai Tangap in Miri, as it shows:

1. WPC 09 - Sg. Arip Bridge to Bintulu Airoprt Junction - KKBWCT Joint Venture Sdn Bhd. 2. WPC 10 - Bintulu Airport Junction - Sg. Tangap - Pekerjaan Piasau Konkerit Sdn Bhd.

See also

 List of airports in Malaysia

References

External links
 Bintulu Airport, Sarawak at Malaysia Airports Holdings Berhad
 

Airports in Sarawak
Bintulu District